Mary-Anne Kenworthy (born 25 May 1956, in Rotorua, New Zealand) is a West Australian brothel owner and businesswoman.  Kenworthy is an advocate for the legalisation of prostitution and improving the rights of sex workers.

Kenworthy's business projects include media interests such as TV and Internet. Until 2022 she owned Langtrees 181 Kalgoorlie. She owns Langtrees VIP Perth, Langtrees VIP Darwin and Langtrees VIP Canberra.

Born in New Zealand, Kenworthy entered the sex industry there in 1981 at age 26. She had three children at the time.  In 1983, she traveled to Australia on holidays and purchases her first non-containment escort agency in Midland, the Agency Escorts & Moonlight Escorts.   In 1984 Kenworthy was accepted into the WA Containment system with the permission of Detective Sergeant Gage.

In 1992, Kenworthy relocated to Burswood and opened Langtrees of Perth.  In 1998 she purchased a brothel in Kalgoorlie.  In 2000, Kenworthy reopened it as the Goldfields theme bordello. It was the only functioning tourist bordello. On 6 June 2002, she became an Australian Citizen

In 2012 The Kalgoorlie business closed down.  In 2013, Kenworthy opened Langtrees of Kalgoorlie Guest Hotel. In 2015, Kenworthy purchased Darwin Escorts in Darwin, Australia. The business is now known as Langtrees VIP Darwin.  In July 2019, she put the Kalgoorlie Bordello for sale It was sold for over $1 million in 2022

Awards
Adult Industry Awards - Hall of Fame

References

External links 
Langtrees website
Talkinsex website & forum
Mary-Anne Kenworthy's official Twitter
Langtrees VIP Perth
Langtrees VIP Canberra
City News, Canberra, 14 March 2014
Langtrees VIP Darwin
The Age, Perth, 4 May 2002
madam to fight brothel closure

1959 births
Living people
Australian brothel owners and madams